Amy Muir (born 7 March 2000) is a Scottish football defender who plays for Glasgow City in the Scottish Women's Premier League (SWPL) and the Scotland national team.

Early life
Muir is from Gourock and was educated at Clydeview Academy.

Club career
Muir started her career with Rangers. She moved to Hibernian in July 2019. On 9 June 2022 it was announced that she had signed for Glasgow City. Glasgow manager Eileen Gleeson said of the signing: "I’m delighted that Amy has chosen to join Glasgow City FC. She is an exciting young Scottish player with huge potential and great experience of the Scottish league. Beyond Amy’s capabilities as a player, she is a committed determined character which are key characteristics we look for in a person."

International career
Muir represented Scotland at the under-17 and under-19 levels. She captained the under-19 team at the 2019 UEFA Women's Under-19 Championship, which Scotland hosted.

Muir was added to the full Scotland squad for the first time in August 2019 as an injury replacement, but she had to withdraw herself due to injury a day later. She made her full international debut at the 2020 Pinatar Cup, as she appeared as substitute in a 2–1 win against Northern Ireland on 10 March.

References 

2000 births
Living people
Scottish women's footballers
Rangers W.F.C. players
Hibernian W.F.C. players
Scottish Women's Premier League players
Women's association football midfielders
Scotland women's international footballers
People from Gourock
Footballers from Inverclyde
Glasgow City F.C. players